Bryan Konietzko is an American animator, writer, producer and musician. He is best known, together with Michael Dante DiMartino, as the co-creator and executive producer of the animated series Avatar: The Last Airbender and The Legend of Korra.

Career
Konietzko has worked as a character designer at Film Roman for Family Guy and as assistant director for Mission Hill and King of the Hill. He was a storyboard artist and art director for the Nickelodeon animated series Invader Zim.

Between 2001 and 2014, Konietzko, together with Michael Dante DiMartino, was mainly occupied with writing and producing the animated series Avatar: The Last Airbender and its sequel The Legend of Korra for Nickelodeon. Konietzko's and DiMartino's long-standing creative partnership is collectively referred to as "Bryke" by fans, in reference to "shipping" naming conventions.

As of 2015, Konietzko was working on writing and illustrating a sci-fi graphic novel series, Threadworlds, that is to be published by First Second Books, but there is no release date.

Konietzko is also active in photography and has a band, Ginormous, with which he has released several albums. These include Our Ancestors' Intense Love Affair and At Night, Under Artificial Light.

Developments related to variations on Avatar
In September 2018, Netflix announced that Konietzko and DiMartino would serve as executive producers and showrunners for the live-action series based on Avatar: The Last Airbender, to be released in 2022. On August 12, 2020, Konietzko and DiMartino revealed on social media that they had both departed the show, due to creative differences with the Netflix team.

In February 2021, ViacomCBS (the parent company of Nickelodeon) announced its formation of Avatar Studios, a division of Nickelodeon centered on developing newer animated series and movies set in the same universe as Avatar: The Last Airbender and The Legend of Korra. Konietzko and DiMartino will jointly lead the studio as co-chief creative officers reporting to Nickelodeon Animation Studio president, Ramsey Ann Naito. The first project will be an animated theatrical film which is set to start production later in 2021.

Personal life
Konietzko graduated from Roswell High School in Roswell, Georgia, a suburb north of Atlanta. He earned a Bachelor of Fine Arts degree in Illustration from the Rhode Island School of Design.

He resides in Los Angeles, California with his wife Lisa.

References

External links 
 
 
 Band website

American animators
American animated film producers
American animated film directors
American film producers
American male screenwriters
Living people
People from Roswell, Georgia
Place of birth missing (living people)
Rhode Island School of Design alumni
American people of Slavic descent
American storyboard artists
Screenwriters from Georgia (U.S. state)
American cartoonists
Nickelodeon Animation Studio people
Showrunners
Year of birth missing (living people)